is a railway station in Nagayo, Nagasaki Prefecture, Japan. It is operated by JR Kyushu and is on the Nagasaki Main Line.

Lines
Only local trains run on this branch.

Station layout 
The station consists of two side platforms serving two tracks with a siding branching off track 1. The station building isa hashigami structure where the station facilities such as a waiting area, ticket window and ticket gates are placed on a bridge which spans the tracks. After the ticket gates, flights of steps connect to the platforms.

Management of the station has been outsourced to the JR Kyushu Tetsudou Eigyou Co., a wholly owned subsidiary of JR Kyushu specialising in station services. It staffs the ticket window which is equipped with a Midori no Madoguchi facility.

Adjacent stations

History
On 27 November 1898, Nagayo became a through-station when a link up was made with the track from Tosu which had expanded south to Ōmura. When the Kyushu Railway was nationalized on 1 July 1907, Japanese Government Railways (JGR) took over control of the station. On 12 October 1909, track from Tosu through Haiki, Ōmura, Nagayo to Nagasaki was designated the Nagasaki Main Line. On 2 October 1972, a shorter inland bypass route was opened between  through  to Urakami was opened, which became known as the new line or Ichinuno branch of the Nagasaki Main Line. The section serving Nagayo became known as the old line or the Nagayo branch. With the privatization of Japanese National Railways (JNR), the successor of JGR, on 1 April 1987, control of the station passed to JR Kyushu.

Passenger statistics
In fiscal 2016, the station was used by an average of 1,943 passengers daily (boarding passengers only), and it ranked 94th  among the busiest stations of JR Kyushu.

Environs
Nagayo Station Community Hall

East Exit (Park Exit)
Yoshimuta Park
Nagayo Town Hall
Nakao-jō Park
Nagayo-chōmin Culture Hall (長与町民文化ホール)
Ceramics Hall (陶芸の館)

West Exit (University Exit)
Nagasaki Prefectural Route 33
Nagayo Daini Junior High School
Siebold University of Nagasaki

References

External links
Nagayo Station (JR Kyushu)

Railway stations in Nagasaki Prefecture
Nagasaki Main Line
Railway stations in Japan opened in 1897